Calycosiphonia is a genus of flowering plants in the family Rubiaceae. It is native to tropical Africa from Ivory Coast to Sudan to Mozambique.

Species
 Calycosiphonia macrochlamys (K.Schum.) Robbr. - Ghana, Cameroon, Equatorial Guinea, São Tomé and Príncipe, Democratic Republic of the Congo
Calycosiphonia spathicalyx (K.Schum.) Robbr. - Ghana, Côte d'Ivoire, Nigeria, Central African Republic, Cameroon, Congo-Brazzaville, Democratic Republic of the Congo, Sudan, Kenya, Tanzania, Uganda, Angola, Malawi, Mozambique

References

 
Rubiaceae genera
Taxonomy articles created by Polbot